Franciszek Kępka (April 4, 1940 – December 15, 2001) was a Polish glider pilot.

Biography 
He was the son of Franciszek Kępka senior. He performed his first flight at the age of 10. He became European champion in 1992 in Szeged, Hungary, in the same year he received the Lilienthal Gliding Medal and was awarded the Paul Tissandier Diploma. During his career he flew over 150 000 kilometers and flew more than 6 500 hours in gliders.

Greatest achievements

References

Further reading

External links 
 Odznaczenia FAI indywidualnych dyscyplin lotniczych 
 Pożegnanie Franciszka Kępki
 Nadanie imienia Franciszka Kępki ZSTiH w Bielsku-Białej
 Fundusz „Talent Szybowcowy” im. Franciszka Kępki

Polish glider pilots
People from Cieszyn County
1940 births
2001 deaths
Lilienthal Gliding Medal recipients